Aleksander Zawadzki, born Józef Antoni Zawadzki, (6 May 1798 in Bielitz, Austrian Silesia – 5 June 1868 in Brno) was a Polish naturalist, author of flora and fauna lists of the Galicia region and the neighbourhood of Lviv. He was also the first scientist who studied and catalogued the beetles and butterflies of Eastern Galicia.

Biography
Zawadski was the teacher of zoologist Stanisław Konstanty Pietruski and between 1835–37 he was a lecturer of botany and then professor of physics (1849–53) at Lviv University.

In the years 1854–68 he studied evolution, and in Brno, where he arrived as a result of the turmoil caused by the Spring of Nations (Wiosna Ludów), became a mentor of Gregor Mendel, directing his talent toward the development of the theory of evolution and helping to lay the foundations of genetics.

He was a member of several scientific societies, and the editor of Lviv's magazines Rozmaitości and Mnemozyna.

Chrysanthemum zawadskii, a species of chrysanthemum described by Franz Herbich, is named after him.

Published Work

Further reading

References

Notes 

1798 births
1868 deaths
People from Bielsko
19th-century Polish botanists
Polish naturalists
19th-century Polish physicists
People from Austrian Silesia
People from Cieszyn Silesia